Akkawi cheese (also Akawi, Akawieh and Ackawi) is a white brine cheese named after the city of Akka (Acre, present-day Israel).

Etymology
Akkawi cheese is named after the port city of Akka (Acre, present-day Israel, also known as Akko (ʻAkkō)). Akkawi in Arabic means "from Akka".

Production and storage
Akkawi is commonly made with pasteurized cow's milk, but can also be made with goat or sheepmilk. This cheese is largely produced in the Middle East, notably in Israel,  Palestine, Lebanon, Jordan, Syria, Egypt, and Cyprus. In these regions, people usually eat it with a soft flatbread during lunch and dinner. Akkawi is hand-packed into square draining hoops and then cured in a salted whey brine for two days.

Texture and taste
The color is white and it has a smooth texture and a mild salty taste. It is commonly used as a table cheese eaten by itself or paired with fruit.

The texture can be compared to mozzarella, feta or a mizithra, since it does not melt easily. Akkawi can be stored up to a year. The texture and flavor is a result of its specific culturing from its curds that are kept together for a prolonged period longer than simpler tasting curd cheese such as Syrian cheese when akkai is transformed into cheese.

Supply chain problems
The supply of akkawi has often been a problem in the Middle East. During the Lebanese Civil War, dairy animals were slaughtered and the country had to import akkawi from Eastern Europe. In Los Angeles, people used to make a substitute for akkawi by soaking feta cheese in several changes of water to desalinate it.

See also

References

Brined cheeses
Cow's-milk cheeses
Stretched-curd cheeses
Arab cuisine
Middle Eastern cheeses
Jordanian cuisine
Lebanese cuisine
Palestinian cuisine
Syrian cuisine